Carl's Afternoon in the Park is a children's picture book by Alexandra Day.  The book was copyrighted in 1991.  The book is largely pictorial with text only on the very first and very last pages.

Synopsis
The book starts when a woman walking in the park with her baby daughter and her rottweiler Carl run into a friend of hers. The lady's friend has with her a rottweiler puppy. The two friends decide to go off to have some tea and leave the baby alone with the rottweiler and the rottie pup. The book is a look at the adventures of a dog and a baby in the park.  At the end of the book, the women return to express that they hope the dog and baby weren't bored after having been left alone too long.

Reception
Publishers Weekly states 'Move over, Mary Poppins, and make room for Carl, the ravishing rottweiler babysitter who makes his fourth and perhaps finest appearance yet in this gorgeously colored picture book.', while Kirkus finds that 'The dogs are as charmingly true to life as ever, while the fantasy will beguile fans and worry a few literal-minded caregivers.'

See also 

Good Dog, Carl

References

1991 children's books
American picture books
Fictional dogs